Florian Zogg (born 26 September 1900, date of death unknown) was a Swiss cross-country skier. He competed in the men's 18 kilometre event at the 1928 Winter Olympics.

References

1900 births
Year of death missing
Swiss male cross-country skiers
Olympic cross-country skiers of Switzerland
Cross-country skiers at the 1928 Winter Olympics
Place of birth missing